Gabriel Silva Vieira, (born 22 March 2002) is a Brazilian footballer who plays as a forward for Portuguese club Santa Clara, on loan from Palmeiras.

Career statistics

Club

Notes

Honours
Palmeiras
Campeonato Paulista: 2020
Copa do Brasil: 2020

Copa Libertadores: 2020
Copa São Paulo de Futebol Júnior: 2022

References

2002 births
People from Ribeirão Preto
Footballers from São Paulo (state)
Living people
Brazilian footballers
Brazil youth international footballers
Association football forwards
Sociedade Esportiva Palmeiras players
C.D. Santa Clara players
Campeonato Brasileiro Série A players
Primeira Liga players
Brazilian expatriate footballers
Expatriate footballers in Portugal
Brazilian expatriate sportspeople in Portugal